Neues Budapester Abendblatt was a liberal German-language daily newspaper, published from Budapest. The last issue of the newspaper was published on January 7, 1922.

References 

Mass media in Austria-Hungary
Newspapers published in Budapest
German-language newspapers published in Hungary
History of Budapest
Defunct newspapers published in Hungary
Publications disestablished in 1922
Publications with year of establishment missing
Daily newspapers published in Hungary